Silver Lake is a hamlet in Wyoming County, New York, United States. It is located on New York State Route 39 south of the village of Perry in the Town of Castile. It is named for the nearby lake to the west, which extends from the village of Perry south to Silver Lake State Park near Silver Springs. Silver Lake's main attractions include its scenery, fishing and boating, and its location near Letchworth State Park.

Geography
Silver Lake is located at  (42.701729, -78.021951). The lake is one of few in the United States that has its inlet and outlet at the same end.

History
Silver Lake was the focus of a legend surrounding a sea serpent that was reportedly seen in the nearby lake in the mid-19th century. According to an affidavit sworn by four men who were out fishing on July 13, 1855, it was a  serpent with glowing, red eyes. The resulting frenzy that came from this story created an immense boom for the nearby town of Perry and Silver Lake. After this incident, about 100 other people claimed to see the giant beast. This phenomenon lasted throughout the summer and was last seen towards the end of the season. Despite the lack of appearance, it remained one of the most popular places in America.

One of the main beneficiaries of the sea serpent was A. B. Walker, the owner of the Walker Hotel in Silver Lake. When the Hotel burned down in 1857, firemen discovered the remains of the legend: a large mass of canvas. He had constructed the entire monster in order to attract business to the lake. It was said he got the idea from a Native American legend.

The community is home to the Silver Lake Institute Historic District on the east bank of the lake, listed on the National Register of Historic Places in 1985.

Today
Silver Lake has yet to revive the popularity it once had, but it remains a favorite among those in the area. The Perry Public Beach has been recently renovated and hosts Shake on the Lake, a Shakespeare company founded in Silver Lake in 2012. The Pioneer Log Cabin and Museum Is a historic building housing artifacts, and a former schoolhouse is on the grounds, moved from the village of Perry. An annual Pioneer Picnic has been held on the grounds since 1874, occurring on the first Sunday in August. A portion of an Indian Council Tree was relocated at the museum in 1882 from Pavilion, Genesee County, for preservation.

One attraction that is bringing people from across Western New York is the Charcoal Corral. It houses mini golf, bouncy castles, an arcade, ice cream and pizza parlor, a performance stage, and the Silver Lake Twin Drive-in Theatre.

References

External links
 1SilverLake.com

Hamlets in New York (state)
Hamlets in Wyoming County, New York